Mayliewan is a neighbourhood in northeast Edmonton, Alberta, Canada. Subdivision and development of the neighbourhood is guided by the Mayliewan Neighbourhood Structure Plan (NSP).

It is located within Edmonton's Lake District and was originally considered Neighbourhood 7 within the Edmonton North Area Structure Plan (ASP).

Mayliewan is bounded by the Belle Rive neighbourhood across 82 Street to the west, the Schonsee neighbourhood across 167 Avenue to the north, the Ozerna neighbourhood to the east, and the Kilkenny neighbourhood across 153 Avenue to the south.

Demographics 

Housing 
In 2005, Mayliewan's housing breakdown consisted of 97% single-family dwellings and 3% duplexes.

Education 
The St. John Bosco Elementary School, operated by Edmonton Catholic Schools, is located in Mayliewan.

Surrounding neighbourhoods

References

External links 
 Mayliewan Neighbourhood Profile

Neighbourhoods in Edmonton